Layla is a town in central Saudi Arabia. It is the principal town of the Al-Aflaj oasis in Riyadh Region, some 330 km south of the capital, Riyadh.  It is believed to have been named after Layla of Bani 'Amir, a 7th-century woman from the local tribe of Bani 'Amir who was immortalized in the poetry of her lover Qays ibn Al-Mulawwah.  The romance of Qays and Layla is perhaps the most famous romance of Arabic literature, and was chronicled by Persian poet Nizami in Layla wal Majnun ("Layla and the Madman").

Several tribes have governed the town across two millennia, including tribes of Kaab ibn 'Amir, then 'Uqayl ibn 'Amir and Alshathri.

The population of the town and its surrounding villages and hamlets is nearly 76,000, largely consisting of settled Bedouins from the Dawasir tribe. Layla neighbours a dry lake bed called Umm Jabal.

A crater on Mars has been named after this town.

See also 

 List of cities and towns in Saudi Arabia
 Regions of Saudi Arabia

References

Populated places in Riyadh Province